IND$FILE is a file transfer program from IBM that was first released in 1983 to allow the transfer of files between an IBM PC running the IBM 3270 emulator (PC/3270) and a VSE, MVS or VM/CMS mainframe. IND$FILE originally worked only with the SEND and RECEIVE commands of the 3270 PC emulator, but today most terminal emulators that have a 3270 mode include it.

In the UK, it is also known as IND£FILE, since in the EBCDIC code pages used in the UK the pound sign occupies the position the dollar sign takes in US codepages.

See also
3270 emulator
Kermit (protocol)

References 

IBM mainframe software
File transfer software